The following lists events that happened in 1997 in Libya.

Incumbents
President: Muammar al-Gaddafi
Prime Minister: Abdul Majid al-Qa′ud (until 29 December), Muhammad Ahmad al-Mangoush (starting 29 December)

Events
1997 Libyan Super Cup
1997–98 Libyan Premier League

 
Years of the 20th century in Libya
Libya
Libya
1990s in Libya